Oulu University of Applied Sciences (OAMK) (in Finnish: Oulun ammattikorkeakoulu (Oamk)) is a university of applied sciences in Oulu, Finland with approximately 9,000 students, including around 240 international degree students. The number of incoming exchange students annually is approximately 280.

Education

Degree programmes 
OAMK offers education in approximately 28 bachelor's degree programmes and 17 master's degree programmes in the following fields:

 Information Technology
 Culture
 Business
 Natural Resources 
 Technology
 Social Services and Health Care

All have courses in English. Two bachelor's degree programmes and four master's degree programmes are conducted entirely in English:. 
 Degree Programme in Information Technology (BEng)
 Degree Programme in International Business (BBA)
 Degree Programme in Clinical Optometry (Master of Health Care)
 Degree Programme In Education Entrepreneurship (Master of Culture and Arts)
 Degree Programme in Printed Intelligence (MEng)
 Degree Programme in Water and Environmental Management (MEng)

Professional teacher education 
Professional Teacher Education Programme is meant for teachers and teacher applicants who plan to work at universities of applied sciences or at vocational institutions/colleges.

Other education 
 Open university studies
 Short-term supplementary training

Research, development and innovation activities 
In addition to education, another basic function of OAMK is its research, development and innovation (RDI) activities. RDI activities are guided by the focus areas defined in OAMK’s strategy 2020–2030:
 Environmental knowledge
 Sustainable well-being
 Digital disruption.

RDI activities support the development of the Oulu region and Northern Finland. OAMK co-operates with local enterprises to ensure high-quality education and constant development.

In addition to the strategy, OAMK's RDI work is guided by Oulu Innovation Alliance, a strategic co-operation agreement formed in 2009 by OAMK and the City of Oulu, the University of Oulu, VTT Technical Research Centre of Finland, and Technopolis Plc. OAMK is committed to focusing its activities on the agreed areas of innovation, investing in agreed infrastructures and developing mechanisms for the joint use of the alliance.

Schools 
 School of Business
 School of Engineering and Natural Resources
 School of Information Technology
 School of Media and Performing Arts
 School of Health and Social Care (Oulu and Oulainen Campus)
 School of Professional Teacher Education

References 
 Oulu University of Applied Sciences
Study at Oamk
School of Professional Teacher Education

See also
 List of polytechnics in Finland

Education in Oulu
Universities and colleges in Finland
1996 establishments in Finland